The 1966–67 Midland Football League season was the 67th in the history of the Midland Football League, a football competition in England.

Clubs
The league featured 21 clubs which competed in the previous season, along with one new club:
Grimsby Town reserves

League table

References

External links

M
Midland Football League (1889)